Götz Alsmann (born 12 July 1957) is a German musician, singer and former television presenter.

Biography 

Born in  Münster, Alsmann studied German studies, music and communication studies at the University of Münster from 1977 to 1985. From 1980 to 1988, he played in the band Sentimental Pounders and has played for the Götz Alsmann Band since 1988. He is known in Germany as presenter of the TV programme Zimmer frei! along with Christine Westermann. Alsmann is married and has one son.

Awards 
 2000: Adolf Grimme Award for Zimmer frei!
 2004: Echo
 2006: Goldene Stimmgabel
 2010: Münchhausen Prize

Discography

Götz Alsmann and the Sentimental Pounders:
Hip to the Tip / Bird Walk (1981)
People Are People / Lonesome Pine (1985)
Bop Caliente / Mad at You (1985)

References

External links 

 Official website

20th-century German male singers
German television personalities
German musicologists
Living people
1957 births
Musicians from North Rhine-Westphalia
People from Münster